Mor Shaked (born 23 December 1986) is an Israeli footballer who currently plays for F.C. Holon Yermiyahu.

Notes

1986 births
Living people
Israeli Jews
Israeli footballers
Hapoel Ra'anana A.F.C. players
Hapoel Hod HaSharon F.C. players
Hapoel Nir Ramat HaSharon F.C. players
Beitar Tel Aviv Bat Yam F.C. players
Maccabi Be'er Sheva F.C. players
Sektzia Ness Ziona F.C. players
Hapoel Rishon LeZion F.C. players
Beitar Jerusalem F.C. players
Hapoel Bnei Lod F.C. players
Maccabi Petah Tikva F.C. players
Hapoel Petah Tikva F.C. players
Maccabi Herzliya F.C. players
Hapoel Umm al-Fahm F.C. players
Maccabi Yavne F.C. players
F.C. Holon Yermiyahu players
Liga Leumit players
Israeli Premier League players
Footballers from Hod HaSharon
Association football midfielders